Portland Film Festival is a non-profit organization which hosts events and programs in Portland, Oregon. It was founded in 2013 by Joshua Leake with the help of Jay Cornelius. Their main event called the Portland Film Festival is an annual independent film festival that is held in several local theaters in Portland. This event focuses on showcasing films, but also provide food, a range of events to participate in, and other forms of entertainment.

History 
Jay Cornelius helped Leake set up the first festival by recruiting people that he knew from his previous job as a film instructor. There were over 148 volunteers that helped pull off the first Portland Film Festival. These volunteers helped with a wide range of activities from directing music, operations, other volunteers, and social media, to helping with legal advising, talking photos, and more.

The first film festival was held from August 27 through September 1, 2013 and featured networking events, workshops, a beer garden, and food carts. 83 films were shown in the inaugural festival and over 600 were submitted for consideration at the festival.

Theaters and Venues 
The festival has been hosted at a range of locations across Portland including Fifth Avenue Cinema, Clinton St. Theater, Cinema 21, Crystal Ballroom, Crystal Ball & Restaurant, Hollywood Theater, Laurelhurst Theater, Living Room Theater, McMenamin's Mission Theater, Plum Tree Mortgage Education Center, Pro Photo Supply Event Center, Wallace Park, Waterfront Park, White Space Gallery, The Fields Park, and the Hi-Lo Hotel.

2019 Award Winners 
Best Narrative Feature: Princess of the Row by Max Carlson

Best Documentary Feature: Fire on the Hill by Brett Fallentine

Best Director: Gavin Nichael Booth for Last Call

Best Short: Janeby Kathryn Prescott

Audience Award Winners: The First and the Last Time, Ashes to Ashes, Colour Code

Two new award categories were added at the 2019 Portland Film Festival-

Best New Director: Tim True for Here Awhile

Best Midnight Feature: Crack House of the Dead by Jason Toler

Other Programs and Events 
The Portland Film Festival nonprofit hosts other film festivals, events, and programs offered year round including the Portland Documentary Film Festival (PDOC) and the Portland Short Film Festival (PDXShorts), as well as others including:

#FutureFilmmakers 
The #FutureFilmmakers program offers free educational workshops to children who are disadvantaged. In the workshops hosted in partner with the Boys and Girls Clubof Portland, children work with professionals in the film industry and are taught about movie making. A few short films are produced by the participants by the end of each workshop.

Kids Film Festival 
The Kids Film Festival is a festival hosted by the Portland Film Festival that focuses on child films. All of the films shown at this event are performed and/or made by children.

Portland Film Club 
Portland Film Club is the largest film club in Oregon with over 4 thousand members. The group claims to be set up like a bookclub, meeting each month to watch a film and have a discussion about it afterwards.

Portland Film Industry Speed Networking Event 
The Portland Film Industry Speed Networking Event is the largest of its kind in Oregon. It is an event hosted annually to bring people in the film industry together to help expand their network. Those who attend the event are offered appetizers and drinks, and are eligible to join a members only Facebook group to continue to reach others.

Portland Film & Video Networking Group 
With over 5 thousand members, the Portland Film & Video Networking Group unites people from the Portland area film industry together to talk in a public group on Facebook.

Portland Independent Film Networking Meetup 
The Portland Independent Film Networking Meetup is a group of over 4 thousand members that host networking opportunities at bars and restaurants for people in the film industry.

References

External links 
 

Film festivals in Oregon
Festivals in Portland, Oregon
Documentary film festivals in the United States
Experimental film festivals
2013 establishments in Oregon
Annual events in Portland, Oregon
Organizations based in Portland, Oregon
Film archives in the United States